Alfredo Zamora García (born 28 March 1963) is a Mexican politician affiliated with the PAN. As of 2013 he served as Deputy of the LXII Legislature of the Mexican Congress representing Baja California Sur.

References

1963 births
Living people
Politicians from Durango
National Action Party (Mexico) politicians
21st-century Mexican politicians
Autonomous University of Coahuila alumni
Academic staff of the Autonomous University of Baja California Sur
Deputies of the LXII Legislature of Mexico
Members of the Chamber of Deputies (Mexico) for Baja California Sur